Bookies is a 2003 German comedy thriller film written by Michael Bacall and directed by Mark Illsley. It stars Nick Stahl, Lukas Haas, Johnny Galecki, and Rachael Leigh Cook. The story revolves around the lives of four college students.

Plot
Three college students, Toby, Casey, and Jude, start up a bookie business taking bets from various clients. Their business immediately booms, arousing suspicion among local campus authorities and Toby's girlfriend, Hunter. They subsequently are able to purchase many expensive items such as big-screen televisions and new computers to help them manage their complex business. When their business takes off, Jude receives threats from two local Italian bookies to back down because of their territories for the business overlap.

When a plan by Jude fails to materialize when betting on the college's team to win the game, Toby devises a way to eliminate the threat from the other bookies and get them out of the business.  Jude makes a bet with the two Italian bookies, letting them choose whatever game and winner they want, which ends up being a boxing match. Knowing the game would be fixed, Jude and the others liquidate all of their assets and bet all of their earnings on the boxing match. The underdog on which they placed the bet won. Some money went to pay off the Italian bookies, while the remaining spoils were divided amongst the three.

Jude drops out of school and Toby says that "he wasn't the first genius to flunk out of college." Casey changes his major, gets new friends, makes the dean's list, and doesn't see Toby much. Toby continues at college and uses his money to get through grad school. He plays Hunter in a foosball match to win another chance with her after having lost her love through the ordeal.

In a post credits scene, the two Italian bookies are seen arguing as they struggle to start a chainsaw, to kill a man previously unseen in the film whom they abducted and had placed in their car's trunk. The film ends as the two get the chainsaw started.

Cast
 Nick Stahl as Toby
 Lukas Haas as Casey
 Johnny Galecki as Jude
 Rachael Leigh Cook as Hunter
 David Proval as Larry
 John Diehl as Vincent
 Julio Oscar Mechoso as Martinez
 Zuri Williams as Duane
 Dwight Armstrong as Abraham
 Steve Hudson as Julius Garrett
 Errol Trotman-Harewood as Professor Felix
 Catherine Britton as Tammy

Reception
Bookies received mixed to positive reviews.

References

External links
 
 
 

2003 films
2000s coming-of-age comedy-drama films
2000s comedy thriller films
American coming-of-age comedy-drama films
American crime comedy-drama films
American comedy thriller films
German crime comedy-drama films
German coming-of-age comedy-drama films
German comedy thriller films
English-language German films
American independent films
Metro-Goldwyn-Mayer films
Films shot in Cologne
German independent films
Films scored by Christopher Tyng
2003 independent films
2000s English-language films
2000s American films
2000s German films